is a Japanese author of erotic novels. His works have often been filmed, most notably by Nikkatsu studio in a prolific series of Roman Pornos giving the author's name in the title.

Life and career
Kōichirō Uno was born in 1934 and first appeared as an author in the 1960s. He is known for his humorous approach to erotica, and for often taking the woman's point-of-view in his work. Director Chūsei Sone's Sigh (1973) was Nikkatsu's first film version of an Uno story.

Like many of his novels, Trembling is a romantic comedy, written in the first person and narrated by a strong female lead character. This best-selling work was the first that Nikkatsu used as a basis for one of their Roman Porno series of mainstream softcore pornographic films. The success of this 1975 film inspired the studio to sign Uno to a contract for producing the Kōichirō Uno series. Over the next decade at least 23 films were made in the series.

Kōichirō Uno's Dancer of Izu (1984), starring actress Kate Asabuki, is generally considered to be the best of the series. Uno wrote the script to this entry directly for the screen as a parody of Yasunari Kawabata's famous story, The Dancing Girl of Izu. In Uno's version, Kawabata's titular classical dancer was instead a stripper.

Kōichirō Uno's Wet and Swinging (also 1984) was another critically praised Uno film. Director Shusuke Kaneko was given the Yokohama Film Festival award for best new director for this film.

Filmography
  (1973)
  (1975)
  (1976)
  (1977)
  (1977)
 宇能鴻一郎のあげちゃいたいの (1978)
 宇能鴻一郎の看護婦寮 (1978)
  (1979)
  (1979)
  (1979)
  (1979)
  (1980)
  (1980)
  (1980)
  (1980)
 宇能鴻一郎の修道院付属女子寮 (1981)
 宇能鴻一郎の開いて写して (1981)
  (1981)
  (1982)
  (1982)
  (1983)
  (1983)
  (1984)
  (1984)
  (1985)

References

Sources
 
 
 
 

Japanese writers
Living people
1934 births
Akutagawa Prize winners